Cozza is a surname of Italian origin. Notable people with the surname include:

Carlo Cozza (c. 1700–1769), Italian painter
Carmen Cozza (1930–2018), American football and baseball coach
Cataldo Cozza (born 1985), Italian-German footballer
Francesco Cozza (footballer) (born 1974), Italian footballer and manager
Francesco Cozza (painter) (1605–1682), Italian painter
Giuseppe Cozza-Luzi (1837–1905), Italian savant and abbot
Liberale Cozza (1768–1821), Italian painter
Lorenzo Cozza (1654–1729), Italian Roman Catholic cardinal, Franciscan friar, and theologian
Lucos Cozza (1921–2011), Italian archaeologist
Mathieu Cozza (born 2002), French rugby league footballer
Nicolas Cozza (born 1999), French footballer
Steven Cozza (born 1985), American road bicycle racer

Italian-language surnames